The Mackerras pendulum for the 2015 New South Wales state election.

Legislative Assembly

Pendulum

 Member for Clarence, Steve Cansdell, resigned on 16 September 2011. He was succeeded by Chris Gulaptis at the 2011 Clarence state by-election.
 Member for Heffron, Kristina Keneally, resigned on 29 June 2012. She was succeeded by Ron Hoenig at the 2012 Heffron state by-election.
 Member for Sydney, Clover Moore, was forced to resign on 20 September 2012. She was succeeded by Alex Greenwich at the 2012 Sydney state by-election.
 Member for Northern Tablelands, Richard Torbay, resigned on 20 March 2013. He was succeeded by Adam Marshall at the 2013 Northern Tablelands state by-election.
 Member for Miranda, Graham Annesley, resigned on 28 August 2013. He was succeeded by Barry Collier at the 2013 Miranda state by-election.
 Member for Wyong, Darren Webber, Member for The Entrance, Chris Spence and Member for Terrigal, Chris Hartcher were suspended for the Liberal Party due to investigations undertaken by the ICAC
 Member for Charlestown, Andrew Cornwell, resigned with immediate effect in August 2014. He was succeeded by Jodie Harrison at the 2014 Charlestown state by-election.
 As a result of a redistribution, the ALP-held seat of Macquarie Fields becomes notionally Liberal. ALP-held Toongabbie is replaced by the notionally Liberal electorate of Seven Hills.

Legislative Council

Current balance

References

Pendulums for New South Wales state elections